Dinakrushna College is a college in Jaleswar, Odisha, India and is the oldest government-aided institution in the north of Balasore district. It was established in 1964 for the purpose of providing higher education in the rural area. It offers both intermediate (+2) & graduation (+3) courses. It is affiliated to Fakir Mohan University and accredited by the NAAC with a 'B' Grade.

History 
The institution was established in 1964 and named after the Odia poet Bhaktakavi Dinakrushna Das. Previously its graduation course was affiliated to Utkal University, but in the year of 2006 it became affiliated to Fakir Mohan University. Its +2 courses are affiliated to CHSE, Odisha.

Courses 
The institute offers courses in +2 Science & Arts as an intermediate qualification. It also offers degree courses in English, Economics, History, Political Science, Philosophy, Sanskrit, Oriya, Physics, chemistry, Botany and Zoology. It is also a local study centre of IGNOU since 2006.

Admission procedure 
The admission process of both +2 & +3 is done through e-admission administrated by CHSE, Odisha.

References

External links
 Official Website

Department of Higher Education, Odisha
Universities and colleges in Odisha
Education in Balasore district
Educational institutions established in 1964
1964 establishments in Orissa